Joshua Morgerman is an American businessman, storm chaser, and TV personality best known for his multitude of tropical cyclone chases. Born in 1970, he developed an interest in meteorology at an early age. After graduating from Harvard University in 1992, he co-founded the digital advertising company Symblaze in 1999. His storm chasing career began in earnest in 2005 with Hurricane Wilma in Florida.

With no formal education in meteorology, all his experience comes from the chases. In all of the years he has been chasing, Morgerman has intercepted 73 tropical cyclones including Typhoon Haiyan in 2013, Hurricane Patricia in 2015, and Hurricane Dorian in 2019, all of which were amongst the 15 strongest tropical systems recorded on Earth during the modern satellite era. In total, he has successfully entered the eye of 48 hurricane-force tropical cyclones, with the strongest being Hurricane Dorian since he did not fully cross paths with the eye of Haiyan.

Early life
Josh Morgerman was born in 1970 and grew up in Huntington, New York—part of suburban New York City. Living on Long Island, he developed an interest in meteorology at an early age; his mother attributes part of this interest to him seeing The Wizard of Oz when Morgerman was four. In August 1976, Hurricane Belle struck Long Island as a Category 1 hurricane, causing significant damage in his hometown.

At his father's insistence, Morgerman pursued a liberal arts degree at Harvard University rather than focusing on meteorology. In 1991, while attending Harvard, Morgerman went on his first hurricane chase: Hurricane Bob in Rhode Island.

In 1999, Morgerman co-founded the digital advertising company Symblaze alongside his friend Michael Horton. By 2004, he was living in Prague, Czech Republic, to work with Eastern European clientele.

Personal life 
Morgerman has no spouse nor kids, wishing to remain unburdened by family responsibilities to pursue cyclone chases. In his spare time, Morgerman often studies historic tropical cyclones.

iCyclone
Since 1991, Morgerman has been chasing tropical cyclones. His goal is to "core punch" the storms and record atmospheric pressure and document the experience. With no formal education in meteorology, Morgerman's cyclone chasing is a passion project. All of his experience is in the field, though he advertises himself as an "adrenaline junkie". In an interview with The Washington Post in 2012, he stated this to be the primary motivator for chasing.

He often relies on his instincts backed up by years of chasing cyclones. Morgerman leads the iCyclone chase team. Members include his "right-hand guy" Scott Brownfield who coordinates logistics or assists on chases, meteorologists Adam Moyer and Jorge González who provide forecasting information, and Cory Van Pelt who serves as the iCyclone technician. In 2013, iCyclone expanded their chase region to East Asia, teaming up with fellow chasers James Reynolds and Mark Thomas. They ultimately intercepted four typhoons in one month including Typhoon Haiyan which devastated the Philippines. Since 2014, his chasing has been funded by multiple media agencies including CBS, the Weather Channel, and WeatherNation. In 2017, Morgerman conducted his first and so far only Australian chase, intercepting Cyclone Debbie in Queensland.

Data collection and usage
Morgerman collects atmospheric pressure with multiple Kestrel 4500s. The data he has collected has been utilized by the National Hurricane Center (NHC) in multiple instances to refine landfall intensities. 2011's Hurricane Rina's landfall in the Yucatán Peninsula was adjusted in light of his observations. In conjunction with satellite intensity estimates, his measurement of  within the eye of Hurricane Ernesto in 2012 was utilized to upgrade the hurricane's landfall intensity to Category 2.

Morgerman provided the only observed over-land pressure with Hurricane Willa's Mexican landfall in 2018.

In 2016, Morgerman collaborated with meteorologist Andrew Hagen and Mexican researchers Erik Sereno Trabaldo and Jorge Abelardo González to reanalyze the 1959 Mexico hurricane, then considered to be the strongest landfalling hurricane on the Pacific coast of Mexico. Their analysis determined the storm to have been significantly weaker than originally estimated and resulted in its downgrade from a Category 5 to a Category 4. These revisions were later incorporated into the NHC's Hurricane Database. In 2017, Morgerman co-authored an academic paper published by the American Meteorological Society on the intensity of 2015's Hurricane Patricia. He provided in-situ data describing the structure of the storm and allowing for a more thorough analysis of its landfall.

Tropical cyclone chases
As of September 2022, he has chased 73 cyclones across Australia, East Asia, and North America. Of his successful core penetrations, five were Category 5 and ten were Category 4.

2013 Typhoon Haiyan

On November 7, 2013, Morgerman flew with fellow chasers James Reynolds and Mark Thomas to Tacloban City in the Philippines to intercept one of the most powerful typhoons in the 21st century: Typhoon Haiyan.

They initially planned to ride out the storm south of the city, where the eye would ultimately make landfall; however, owing to a lack of sturdy shelters they opted to stay in Tacloban itself. The chasers came prepared with a week's-worth of food and water. Around 6:45 a.m. local time, the northern eyewall began battering Tacloban and winds rapidly became violent. Morgerman described the winds to have a "tornado-like quality" at times. Windows and doors at the hotel blew out and the roof was torn off. Trees in the region were completely defoliated.

The fast-rising nature of the water incited panic, residents sheltering at the hotel scrambled to the building's second floor and some broke windows to escape their rooms. Morgerman jumped into the water to help people get from flooding rooms to the stairs. Thomas severely injured his leg in the water while assisting trapped people.

Morgerman described the experience as traumatizing, witnessing the total devastation of Tacloban, bodies strewn across the streets, and "a city spiraling out of control". The crew was stuck in Tacloban for three days, eventually "escaping" on November 10 by which time the Philippine military arrived with relief supplies.

2014 Hurricane Odile

In September 2014, Morgerman intercepted Hurricane Odile in Cabo San Lucas, Mexico. Operational assessments of the hurricane's landfall intensity were taken into account for the release of catastrophe bonds funded by Wall Street and the World Bank. However, his observations "upend[ed] the system" and the bonds were rescinded. This prevented vital recovery funds from being provided to the Government of Mexico. The hurricane caused extensive damage throughout Baja California Sur, with insured losses estimated at $1.2 billion. Industry experts later expressed concern over possible conflicts of interest with storm chasers and the catastrophe bonds.

2019 Hurricane Dorian

On August 31, 2019, Morgerman flew to Marsh Harbour, in the Bahamas to intercept Category 5 Hurricane Dorian. Initially staging his chase in Treasure Cay, he ultimate chose to ride out the storm at Central Abaco Primary School—a designated concrete shelter—in Marsh Harbour. At 11:40 a.m. EDT on September 1, Morgerman reported board to be flying off the structures windows and children being wrapped in blankets for safety. After tweeting this information, contact with Morgerman lost for two days before he was able to contact the Weather Channel.

Around 2:00 p.m. The eyewall of Dorian proved exceptionally violent, battering the school with "the force of a thousand sledgehammers". He and others sheltering at the school held furniture against window shutters to prevent them from blowing in. The school was largely destroyed in the first half of the hurricane, forcing Morgerman and those sheltering inside to evacuate to a sturdier government building during the calm of the eye. Hundreds of residents, many injured during the storm, sought refuge in the structure for the second half of the hurricane. After living in his car for two days, Morgerman arrived in Nassau by helicopter on September 3 before returning to the United States. He described Dorian as a "nuclear-grade hurricane" and "the most intense cyclone I’ve witnessed in 28 years of chasing".

Hurricane Man
In October 2018, UKTV announced a new television docuseries starring Morgerman to be aired on the network channel Dave. The eight-episode show, titled Hurricane Man, chronicles Morgerman's chases in 2018 across the world. A film crew accompanied him on his chases. The series is produced by ScreenDog Productions and distributed by BBC Studios. In addition to following Morgerman's experiences, the show also focuses on victims of the storms, sharing their experiences and how they're coping with its aftermath.

Morgerman acted more carefully during his chases with the film crew present, feeling responsibility for their safety. The show premiered in the United Kingdom on March 24, 2019, and June 12 in Australia on BBC Knowledge. The show debuted on September 15 in the United States on the Science Channel. The series' first two episodes focus on 2018's Category 5 Hurricane Michael and its effects in Panama City, Florida.

References

1970 births
American businesspeople
People from New York (state)
Storm chasers
Living people
Harvard University alumni